Rondin Allen Johnson (born December 16, 1958 in Bremerton, Washington) is a former Major League Baseball player. He played with the Kansas City Royals of the American League. Johnson played second base in eleven games in 1986 with 8 hits in 31 at-bats for a .258 batting average.

Johnson attended the University of Washington, where he played college baseball for the Huskies from 1978–1980.

References

External links

1958 births
Living people
Kansas City Royals players
Baseball players from Washington (state)
Major League Baseball second basemen
Washington Huskies baseball players
Gulf Coast Royals players
Fort Myers Royals players
Jacksonville Suns players
Omaha Royals players